Wrestling was one of the many sports which was held at the 2002 Asian Games in Busan, South Korea between 2 and 8 October 2002. The competition took place at Yangsan Gymnasium.

Schedule

Medalists

Men's freestyle

Men's Greco-Roman

Women's freestyle

Medal table

Participating nations
A total of 196 athletes from 24 nations competed in wrestling at the 2002 Asian Games:

References
 2002 Asian Games Report, Page 766–783
 Official website

 
2002
Asian Games
2002 Asian Games events